Tikhon Sergeyevich Chicherin (1869–1904) was a Russian entomologist who specialised in Coleoptera, especially Carabidae.

References
Daniel, K. 1906 [Tschitscherin, T. S.]  Münch. Koleopt. Zeitschr. 2 1904-1906(3) 389-390. 
Jacobson, G. 1904 [Tschitscherin, T. S.]  Ezheg. Zool. Muz. Imp. Akad. Sci. 9 XXXII. 
Kryzhanovskij, O. L. 1994: [Tschitscherin, T. S.] Entomologitscheskoje Obozrenije 73(4) 939-942.

External links
ZinRus

Russian entomologists
1869 births
1904 deaths
Biologists from the Russian Empire